Colonel Volodymyr Anatolievich Dashkovsky (Ukrainian: Володимир Анатолійович Дашковський) also known as Vladimir Dashkovsky is a Ukrainian military conductor and composer who serves as the Senior Military Director of the Military Music Department of the General Staff of the Ukrainian Armed Forces (MMD-GSAFU) based in Kyiv.

Biography 
Dashkovsky was born in the city of Cherkasy, in the central part of the Ukrainian SSR in early 1965. In 1987, he graduated with honors from the Moscow Conservatory in the RSFSR and afterwards, returned to Ukraine to conduct in the military bands Kyiv Military District until 1993. Once the KVO was disbanded, he conducted military bands in the Odessa Military District for 5 years until 1998. Upon his removal from the OVO, he formed the 7th Military Headquarters Band of the Northern Operational Command in Chernihiv, which would later become the Military Music Center of the Ukrainian Ground Forces in 2003. He quickly rose through the ranks of the department in the years after, before being appointed the Director of Music of the Military Music Department of the General Staff of the Ukrainian Armed Forces, a position he has served in since 2014. Since then, he has conducted the massed bands of the MMD-GSAFU during the Kyiv Independence Day Parades on Maidan Nezalezhnosti that followed.

Titles
 Honored Artist of Ukraine (1999)
 People's Artist of Ukraine (January 12, 2009)

See also 
 Military Music Department of the General Staff of the Ukrainian Armed Forces
 Moscow Conservatory
 Ukrainian Armed Forces

References 

1965 births
Living people
Male conductors (music)
21st-century conductors (music)
Military music composers
Military musicians
Moscow Conservatory alumni
Recipients of the title of People's Artists of Ukraine
Ukrainian colonels
Ukrainian conductors (music)
Ukrainian military personnel
Musicians from Cherkasy
21st-century male musicians